Bari Karimovich Alibasov (born 6 June 1947, in Charsk, Semipalatinsk Oblast, USSR, now Kazakhstan) is a Moscow-based musical producer best known for creating a successful Russian boy band Na-Na in 1989. Previously he had managed the jazz band Integral from 1965 till 1989. Meritorious Artist of Russia (1999).

References

External links
Na-Na group Official website

Public page of Bari Alibasov and Na-Na on Facebook
Bari Alibasov on Twitter
 

1947 births
Living people
Businesspeople from Moscow
People from Semipalatinsk Oblast
Russian record producers
Honored Artists of the Russian Federation
Russian people of Kazakhstani descent
Russian people of Tatar descent